The Confession of Faith, also called the Second London Baptist Confession, was written by Particular Baptists, who held to a Calvinistic soteriology in England to give a formal expression of their Christian faith from a Baptist perspective.  Because it was adopted by the Philadelphia Association of Baptist Churches in the 18th century, it is also known as the Philadelphia Confession of Faith. The Philadelphia Confession was a modification of the Second London Confession that added an allowance for singing of hymns, psalms and spiritual songs in the Lord's Supper and made optional the laying on of hands in baptism.

History
The confession was first published in London in 1677 under the title "A confession of Faith put forth by the Elders and Brethren of many Congregations of Christians, Baptized upon Profession of their Faith in London and the Country. With an Appendix concerning Baptism." It was based on the First London Baptist Confession of Faith (1644), Westminster Confession of Faith (1646), and the Savoy Declaration (1658) with modifications to reflect Baptist views on church organization and baptism. The confession was published again, under the same title, in 1688 and 1689.

The Act of Toleration passed in 1689 enabled religious freedom and plurality to co-exist alongside the established churches in England and Scotland. This official reprieve resulted in representatives from over 100 Particular Baptist churches to meet together in London from 3–12 September to discuss and endorse the 1677 document. Despite the fact that the document was written in 1677, the official preface to the document has ensured that it would be known as the "1689 Baptist Confession of Faith".

Contents 
The confession consists of 32 chapters, as well as an introduction and a list of signatories.

 Of the Holy Scriptures
 Of God and the Holy Trinity
 Of God's Decree
 Of Creation
 Of Divine Providence
 Of the Fall of Man, of Sin, and of the Punishment Thereof
 Of God's Covenant
 Of Christ the Mediator
 Of Free Will
 Of Effectual Calling
 Of Justification
 Of Adoption
 Of Sanctification
 Of Saving Faith
 Of Repentance Unto Life and Salvation
 Of Good Works
 Of the Perseverance of the Saints
 Of the Assurance of Grace and Salvation
 Of the Law of God
 Of the Gospel and the Extent of Grace
 Of Christian Liberty and Liberty of Conscience
 Of Religious Worship and the Sabbath Day
 Of Lawful Oaths and Vows
 Of the Civil Magistrate
 Of Marriage
 Of the Church
 Of the Communion of Saints
 Of Baptism and the Lord's Supper
 Of Baptism
 Of the Lord's supper
 Of the State of Man After Death, and of the Resurrection of the Dead
 Of the Last Judgment

Confessions 

 The law's continued value - while Christ "abrogated" the Levitical ceremonial laws, the confession cites Christ to have "strengthened this obligation" which "for ever binds all."
 Forbids prayers for the departed whether faithful or damned
 Sabbatarianism - A weekly Sabbath day is prescribed and believed "to be continued to the end of the world" but a 7th year annual sabbath is ignored (cf. Lev. 25ff.)
 Marriage is a monogamous heterosexual ordinance.
 Intermarriage - Christians ought not intermarry with other religions, nor with any who believe "damnable heresies," but are to marry "in the Lord," and thereby not be "unequally yoked".
 Two church offices - 1.) "elders" (also called "bishops" or "pastors"); 2.) "deacons"
 Eternal torment
 An open view on the millennium, the confession does not espouse a particular view on the millennium (cf. chapter 32).

Influences
Particular Baptists were quick to develop churches in colonial America, and in 1707 the Philadelphia Baptist Association was formed. This association formally adopted the 1689 confession in 1742 after years of tacit endorsement by individual churches and congregational members.  With the addition of two chapters (on the singing of psalms and the laying on of hands), it was retitled The Philadelphia Confession of Faith. Further Calvinistic Baptist church associations formed in the mid-late 18th century adopted the confession as "The Baptist Confession".

Current usage 
Baptist churches around the world continue to subscribe to the 1689 Baptist Confession as the fullest statement of their beliefs.  Many 1689 churches are listed in directories like the Reformed Wiki, the Farese Church Directory and the 1689 Church Directory.

Modernisations 
Various attempts have been made to modernise the seventeenth-century language of the 1689 Baptist Confession.  SM Houghton's A faith to Confess is an example of a fairly free modernisation.  Jeremy Walker's Rooted and Grounded is an example of a light modernisation.  A comparison from the first paragraph demonstrates this:". . . which maketh the Holy Scriptures to be most necessary, those former ways of God's revealing His will unto His people being now ceased."  (Banner of Truth, 1689)

"And as the manner in which God formerly revealed His will has long ceased, the Holy Scripture becomes absolutely essential to men."  (A Faith to confess, 1975)

"This means that the Holy Scriptures are most necessary, because God’s former ways of revealing his will to his people have now ended."  (Rooted and Grounded, 2021)

References

External links

The 1689 London Baptist Confession of Faith in Updated English with Scriptural Proofs
The 1689 Baptist Confession of Faith with Extended Scriptural Footnotes

1677 works
Baptist Confession Of Faith, 1689
17th-century Calvinism
17th-century Christian texts
Baptist Christianity in England
Baptist statements of faith
History of Christianity in England
Reformed confessions of faith